Bay View (formerly Darbellay) is an unincorporated community in the town of Red River, Wisconsin, Kewaunee County, Wisconsin, United States.

History
A post office was established at the community located at the junction of County Roads S and SS on July 8, 1887, and closed in 1902.

In the 1800s, Darbellay was named for local resident, postmaster and fire recovery specialist Joseph E. Darbellay.

Notes

Unincorporated communities in Kewaunee County, Wisconsin
Unincorporated communities in Wisconsin